Epidryos is a group of plants in the family Rapateaceae described as a genus with this name in 1962.

The genus is native to South America and to Panama.

 Species
 Epidryos allenii (Steyerm.) Maguire - Panama
 Epidryos guayanensis Maguire - Bolívar, Pakaraima 
 Epidryos micrantherus  (Maguire) Maguire - Colombia, N Ecuador

References

Poales genera
Rapateaceae